Ari Paulino Clemente da Silva (born 7 January 1939) is a Brazilian former footballer who played as a defender.

Career
Born in São Paulo, Clemente played for Corinthians, Bangu, Houston Stars, and Saad. He also earned one cap for the Brazil national team.

References

1939 births
Living people
Brazilian footballers
Brazil international footballers
Sport Club Corinthians Paulista players
Bangu Atlético Clube players
Houston Stars players
Saad Esporte Clube players
United Soccer Association players
Association football defenders
Brazilian expatriate footballers
Brazilian expatriate sportspeople in the United States
Expatriate soccer players in the United States
Footballers from São Paulo